Bettina Somers (17 July 1904 – 22 May 1989) was a Canadian painter. Her work was part of the painting event in the art competition at the 1948 Summer Olympics.

References

1904 births
1989 deaths
20th-century Canadian painters
Canadian women painters
Olympic competitors in art competitions
People from Bloemfontein
20th-century Canadian women artists